Seventh Color is the second Japanese album by the South Korean boy group Boyfriend. It was released in three different versions on July 23, 2014.

Background
It was revealed on May 31, 2014 that Boyfriend will be releasing their second Japanese full-length album. The album will be released in three different versions: Standard Edition, Limited Edition CD + DVD, and LAWSON/HMV Limited Edition CD + DVD.

Track listing

References

Boyfriend (band) albums